Hüseyin Avni Pasha (1820 –  15 June 1876) was an Ottoman governor-general and statesman. 
He was Grand Vizier of the Ottoman Empire from 15 February 1874 to 26 April 1875. He was killed by Çerkess Hassan the younger brother of Neşerek Kadın Efendi, who accused him of the murder of Ottoman Sultan Abdülaziz, on 15 June 1876 during a cabinet meeting of Ottoman Sultan Murad V at the residence of Midhat Pasha near Beyazıt in Fatih, Istanbul. The foreign affairs minister Mehmed Rashid Pasha was also killed in the attack.

See also
 List of Ottoman Grand Viziers

References 

1820 births
1876 deaths
1876 murders in the Ottoman Empire
People from Isparta
Ottoman Military Academy alumni
Ottoman Military College alumni
Field marshals of the Ottoman Empire
19th-century Grand Viziers of the Ottoman Empire
Ottoman governors of Crete
Ottoman governors of Aidin
Murder in the Ottoman Empire